Atebubu is a town in Ghana. It is the capital of Atebubu district in the Bono East Region. With a 2022 population of 143,100 male and 72,548 female.

References

Populated places in the Bono East Region